The 2016–17 Florida Atlantic Owls women's basketball team represented Florida Atlantic University during the 2016–17 NCAA Division I women's basketball season. The Owls, led by fifth year head coach Kellie Lewis-Jay, played their home games at FAU Arena and were members of Conference USA. They finished the season 4–24, 0–18 for in C-USA play to finish in last place. They failed to qualify for the C-USA women's tournament.

Roster

Schedule

|-
!colspan=9 style="background:#003366; color:#CE2029;"| Non-conference regular season

|-
!colspan=9 style="background:#003366; color:#CE2029;"| Conference USA regular season

See also
 2016–17 Florida Atlantic Owls men's basketball team

References

Florida Atlantic Owls women's basketball seasons
Florida Atlantic